Efraín Herrera González (born 28 September 1959) is a Mexican former football defender who played for 20 years in the Mexican Primera División and represented the Mexico national team.

Career
Born in Mexico City, Herrera was a product of the Unión de Curtidores youth system and made his club debut in 1978. He spent most of his career with Club Necaxa, where he won the league title twice. At the end of his career, he joined C.F. Pachuca in the Primera A División and helped the club gain promotion before he retired in 1998. Overall, Herrera had a 20-year career and made over 450 Mexican Primera División appearances with Unión de Curtidores, Club Atlas, Club América, Club Necaxa, Deportivo Toluca F.C. and C.F. Pachuca.

He represented Mexico at the 1991 CONCACAF Gold Cup finals.

After he retired from playing, Herrera became a football coach. He was assistant to Juan Antonio Luna at Club Tijuana during 2009 and 2010.

References

External links
 
 
 

1959 births
Living people
Footballers from Mexico City
Mexico international footballers
Unión de Curtidores footballers
Atlas F.C. footballers
Club América footballers
Club Necaxa footballers
Deportivo Toluca F.C. players
C.F. Pachuca players
Liga MX players
1991 CONCACAF Gold Cup players
Mexican footballers
Association football defenders